The 2015–16 National League B season was the 69th ice hockey season of Switzerland's second tier hockey league, the National League B.

HC Ajoie went on to win the championship by defeating SC Rapperswil-Jona Lakers in the finals. This title is the team's second in its history since 1992 when they won their first National League B championship.

Teams

Regular season
The regular season started on September 11, 2015 and ended on February 13, 2016.

Playoffs
The playoffs started on February 16, 2016 and ended on April 1, 2016.

League Qualification
In League Qualification series HC Ajoie were supposed to play against EHC Biel, but the series were cancelled after HC Ajoie have not handed in their application for a promotion to next year's NLA season.

References

External links
 National League B official website 
 National League B official website 
 National League B, hockeyarchives  

National League B seasons
2015–16 in Swiss ice hockey
Swiss